The list of ship launches in 1798 includes a chronological list of some ships launched in 1798.


References

1798
Ship launches